"Good Times" is a song by Australian rock group Hoodoo Gurus. It was written by Dave Faulkner and released in July 1987 as the second single from the group's third studio album, Blow Your Cool!. The song peaked at number 36 on the Australian charts.

In June 2000, Dave Faulkner said "Brad was off gallivanting in Los Angeles to supervise the recording of the Bangles harmonies on 'Good Times'. We had toured with them the previous year promoting Mars Needs Guitars! and we watched then go to No. 1 with "Manic Monday" as the tour began. Oh well, so much for the co-headline. That tour and its sequel two years later were some of the most fun we ever had on the road."

Track listing
7" version (BTS8)
 "Good Times" (Dave Faulkner) — 3:02
 "Hell for Leather" (live) (Faulkner) — 3:12

Personnel
 Dave Faulkner – lead vocals, guitar, keyboards
 Brad Shepherd – guitar, harmonica
 Mark Kingsmill – drums
 Clyde Bramley – bass
 Richard Allan – Art Direction, Cover Design
 Allan Wright – Engineer
 Heidi Cannavo, Kathy Nauton, Paula Jones, Tchad Blake — Assistant Engineers
 Mark Opitz – Producer
 Barry Diament – Mastering

Charts

References

1987 singles
Hoodoo Gurus songs
1987 songs
Songs written by Dave Faulkner (musician)
EMI Records singles
Song recordings produced by Mark Opitz